Euclasta is the scientific name of two genera of organisms and may refer to:

Euclasta (moth), a genus of moths in the family Crambidae
Euclasta (plant), a genus of plants in the family Poaceae